Malabon's at-large congressional district is the congressional district of the Philippines in Malabon. It has been represented in the House of Representatives of the Philippines since 2010. Previously included in Malabon–Navotas's at-large congressional district, it includes all barangays of the city. It is currently represented in the 19th Congress by Josephine Lacson-Noel of the Nationalist People's Coalition.

Representation history

Election results

2010

2013

2016

2019

2022

See also
Legislative district of Malabon

References

Congressional districts of the Philippines
Politics of Malabon
2007 establishments in the Philippines
At-large congressional districts of the Philippines
Congressional districts of Metro Manila
Constituencies established in 2007